Rodrigo Muniz may refer to:
 Rodrigo Muniz (Brazilian footballer) (born 2001), Brazilian footballer who plays for Fulham
 Rodrigo Muniz (Uruguayan footballer) (born 2001), Uruguayan footballer who plays for Deportivo Maldonado